"Pimpin' All Over the World" is a song by American rapper Ludacris featuring singer Bobby Valentino. The song was released on May 16, 2005, as the fourth and final single from Ludacris's fourth studio album, The Red Light District (2004), and was produced by Polow da Don and Donnie Scantz. The track features Ludacris rapping the verses and Valentino on the chorus. "Pimpin' All Over the World" reached number nine on the US Billboard Hot 100 and number two on the Billboard Hot Rap Tracks chart. The song includes a cameo from comic Katt Williams as well as additional vocals from Keri Hilson.

Music video
The video of the song, filmed in Durban, South Africa, features the group on tropical islands relaxing, drinking, and watching women with binoculars as they dance.

Track listings
US 12-inch vinyl
A1. "Pimpin' All Over the World" (clean) – 4:03
A2. "Pimpin' All Over the World" (main) – 4:03
A3. "Pimpin' All Over the World" (instrumental) – 4:03
B1. "Spur of the Moment" (clean) – 4:15
B2. "Spur of the Moment" (main) – 4:15
B3. "Spur of the Moment" (instrumental) – 4:18

Australian CD single
 "Pimpin' All Over the World" (album version edited)
 "Pimpin' All Over the World" (12-inch version)
 "Pimpin' All Over the World" (instrumental)

Charts

Weekly charts

Year-end charts

Release history

References

2004 singles
2004 songs
Bobby V songs
Def Jam Recordings singles
Ludacris songs
Music videos directed by Director X
Song recordings produced by Polow da Don
Songs written by Donnie Scantz
Songs written by Ludacris
Songs written by Polow da Don